Stone County is located in the Ozark Mountains in the U.S. state of Arkansas. The county is named for rugged, rocky area terrain of the Ozarks. Created as Arkansas's 74th county on April 21, 1873, Stone County has two incorporated cities: Mountain View, the county seat and most populous city, and Fifty-Six. The county is also the site of numerous unincorporated communities and ghost towns.

Most of the county is sparsely populated forested Ozark hills; including the northern fifth of the county managed by the United States Forest Service as the Ozark National Forest. The remainder of the county is used for poultry, ranching, and timber production. The White River runs along the eastern boundary of Stone County. The county contains six protected areas in addition to the Ozark National Forest: Blanchard Springs Caverns within the Ozark National Forest, two Natural Areas, two Wildlife Management Areas and the Ozark Folk Center, which preserves and interprets Ozark cultural heritage, especially traditional mountain folk music and crafts. Other features such as log cabins, one-room school houses, community centers, and museums, as well as annual cultural events, preserve the history and culture of Stone County.

Stone County occupies  and contained a population of 12,359 as of the 2020 Census.

Geography

Stone County is located in the Ozark Mountains, one of the six ecoregions of Arkansas. The Ozarks are a mountainous subdivision of the U.S. Interior Highlands, and Stone County contains the Springfield Plateau, Salem Plateau, and the relatively steeper Boston Mountains subsets. The county is roughly split along an east–west line near Mountain View, the centrally located county seat, with areas north within the Springfield Plateau, and areas south within the Boston Mountains. Areas along the White River, which forms the county's northeastern boundary, are dissected bluffs of the Salem Plateau rather than riparian floodplains.

Stone County is surrounded by three Ozark counties, Searcy County to the west, Baxter County to the northwest, Izard County to the northeast, and three border counties with the Arkansas River Valley, Van Buren County to the southwest, Cleburne County to the south, and Independence County (which also contains a small piece of the Arkansas Delta) to the east.

Hydrology

National protected area
 Ozark National Forest (part)

Demographics

2020 Census

As of the 2020 United States census, there were 12,359 people, 4,787 households, and 3,109 families residing in the county.

2010 Census
As of the 2010 census, there were 12,394 people, 5,325 households, and 3,590 families residing in the county. The population density was 20 people per square mile (7.9/km2). There were 6,712 housing units at an average density of 11 per square mile (4.3/km2). The racial makeup of the county was 96.8% White, 0.1% Black or African American, 0.7% Native American, 0.4% Asian, 0.0% Pacific Islander, 0.4% from other races, and 1.6% from two or more races. 1.3% of the population were Hispanic or Latino of any race.

There were 5,325 households, out of which 26.0% had children under the age of 18 living with them, 67.4% were married couples living together, 7.2% had a female householder with no husband present, and 32.6% were non-families. 28.9% of all households were made up of individuals, and 36.6% had someone living alone who was 65 years of age or older. The average household size was 2.30 and the average family size was 2.81.

In the county, the population was spread out, with 20.6% under the age of 18, 6.2% from 18 to 24, 19.4% from 25 to 44, 31.0% from 45 to 64, and 22.8% who were 65 years of age or older. The median age was 37.2 years. For every 100 females there were 97.8 males. For every 100 females age 18 and over, there were 96.2 males.

The median income for a household in the county was $30,380, and the median income for a family was $36,765. Males had a median income of $28,258 versus $25,341 for females. The per capita income for the county was $16,090. About 16.6% of families and 23.4% of the population were below the poverty line, including 35.7% of those under age 18 and 20.6% of those age 65 or over.

2000 Census

As of the 2000 census, there were 11,499 people, 4,768 households, and 3,461 families residing in the county.  The population density was 19 people per square mile (7/km2).  There were 5,715 housing units at an average density of 9 per square mile (4/km2). The racial makeup of the county was 97.27% White, 0.08% Black or African American, 0.77% Native American, 0.05% Asian, 0.03% Pacific Islander, 0.15% from other races, and 1.64% from two or more races. 1.08% of the population were Hispanic or Latino of any race.

There were 4,768 households, out of which 26.90% had children under the age of 18 living with them, 62.30% were married couples living together, 7.10% had a female householder with no husband present, and 27.40% were non-families. 24.80% of all households were made up of individuals, and 11.20% had someone living alone who was 65 years of age or older. The average household size was 2.38 and the average family size was 2.82.

In the county, the population was spread out, with 22.20% under the age of 18, 7.10% from 18 to 24, 23.60% from 25 to 44, 28.50% from 45 to 64, and 18.60% who were 65 years of age or older.  The median age was 43 years. For every 100 females there were 96.90 males.  For every 100 females age 18 and over, there were 95.30 males.

The median income for a household in the county was $22,209, and the median income for a family was $28,009. Males had a median income of $20,904 versus $16,118 for females. The per capita income for the county was $14,134.  About 14.10% of families and 18.90% of the population were below the poverty line, including 26.20% of those under age 18 and 12.10% of those age 65 or over.

Culture and contemporary life

Media

The county newspaper is the Stone County Leader, a weekly published in Mountain View since 1952. Former newspapers include the Stone County Democrat and Mountain View Herald (1932-1953). Mountain View has also produced several short-lived publications, including the Mountain View News (1905-1906), The Mountain View (1973-1974), and The Ozark Times (1906-1913).

The Stone County Historical Society has published the Heritage of Stone since 1972. Issued twice annually to members and available to the public for individual purchase, the publication covers topics relating to the history and culture of Stone County.

Government

The county government is a constitutional body granted specific powers by the Constitution of Arkansas and the Arkansas Code. The quorum court is the legislative branch of the county government and controls all spending and revenue collection. Representatives are called justices of the peace and are elected from county districts every even-numbered year. The number of districts in a county vary from nine to fifteen, and district boundaries are drawn by the county election commission. The Stone County Quorum Court has nine members. Presiding over quorum court meetings is the county judge, who serves as the chief operating officer of the county. The county judge is elected at-large and does not vote in quorum court business, although capable of vetoing quorum court decisions.

Taxation

Property tax is assessed by the Stone County Assessor annually based upon the fair market value of the property and determining which tax rate, commonly called a millage in Arkansas, will apply. The rate depends upon the property's location with respect to city limits, school district, and special tax increment financing (TIF) districts. This tax is collected by the Stone County Collector between the first business day of March of each year through October 15th without penalty. The Stone County Treasurer disburses tax revenues to various government agencies, such as cities, county road departments, fire departments, libraries, and police departments in accordance with the budget set by the quorum court.

Sales and use taxes in Arkansas are voter approved and collected by the Arkansas Department of Finance and Administration.
Arkansas's statewide sales and use tax has been 6.5% since July 1, 2013. Stone County has an additional sales and use tax of 1%, which has been in effect since May 1, 1987. Within Stone County, the City of Mountain View has had an additional 2% sales and use tax since September 1, 2005. The Arkansas State Treasurer disburses state tax revenue to counties/cities in accordance with tax rules.

Politics
In Congress, Arkansas has been represented by two Republican senators (John Boozman and Tom Cotton) since January 3, 2015, ending a long history of Democratic hegemony. In the House of Representatives, Stone County is within the Arkansas 1st district, which contains the Arkansas Delta. The Arkansas 1st has been represented by Rick Crawford since 2010.

In the Arkansas Senate, Stone County is within the 18th District, which also contains all of Cleburne and Searcy counties and parts of Faulkner, Fulton, Baxter, Marion, Van Buren, and White counties. The 18th District has been represented by Missy Irvin (R) of Mountain View since 2011.

Communities
Two incorporated cities are located within the county. The largest city and county seat, Mountain View, is relatively centrally located in the oddly-shaped county. Mountain View's population in 2010 was 2,748, marking the first decennial decline since the 1960 Census. Fifty-Six has maintained a stable population under 200 since incorporation.

Stone County has dozens of unincorporated communities and ghost towns within its borders. This is due to early settlers in Arkansas tending to settle in small clusters rather than incorporated towns. For example, communities like Newnata had a post office and dozens of buildings at some point in their history. Other communities are simply a few dwellings at a crossroads that have adopted a common place name over time. Some are officially listed as populated places by the United States Geological Survey, and others are listed as historic settlements.

Cities
Fifty-Six
Mountain View (county seat)

Unincorporated communities

Alco
Allison
Arlberg
Ben
Big Springs
Chalybeate Springs
East Richwoods
Flag
Fox
Gayler
Hanover
Harness
Herpel
Luber
Lydalisk
Marcella
Meadow Creek
Melrose
Mozart
Newnata
Old Lexington
Onia
Optimus
Parma
Pleasant Grove
Pleasant Hill
Rushing
St. James
Timbo
Turkey Creek
West Richwoods

Historical communities

Bluetip
Bothersome
Boyle
Buckhorn
Hedges
Kahoka
May
Oga
Pekin
Red Stripe

Townships

 Arbana (small part of Mountain View)
 Blue Mountain (most of Mountain View)
 Bryan
 Farris
 Flag
 Franklin
 Harris (small part of Mountain View)
 Jones
 Liberty
 Locust Grove
 Marcella
 Northwest (Fifty-Six)
 Optimus
 Red River
 Red Stripe
 Richwoods
 Roasting Ear
 Smart
 Sylamore
 Timbo
 Turkey Creek
 Union
 Washington
 Wilson

Infrastructure

Aviation
Mountain View Airport is the only public owned/public use airport in Stone County. Also known as Harry E. Wilcox Memorial Field, the facility is a small, rural general aviation airport with 5,650 annual operations. Stone County also contains one private airfield. The nearest commercial service airport is Clinton National Airport in Little Rock.

Major highways

Stone County is not served by any Interstate highways nor United States highways; the nearest access to the Interstate system is Interstate 40 (I-40) in Conway. Ten state highways serve the traveling public in the county, varying from short connector routes to long highways traversing the entire county. Highway 5 and Highway 9 are major north–south highways across the Ozarks; each crosses through the county through Mountain View. The two routes briefly form a concurrency, or overlap, between Mountain View and Allison.

Highway 14 is a major east–west highway across northern Arkansas, it crosses the county and connects Mountain View and Fifty-Six via an overlap with Highway 5 and Highway 9. Highway 87 connects the communities more directly along a winding alignment. Highway 66 has its eastern terminus in Mountain View, and runs west to Leslie in Searcy County, connecting Mountain View to US Highway 65 (US 65). Highway 263 connects several unincorporated communities in southwestern Stone County. Highway 382 serves as an access for Ozark Folk Center State Park. Highway 58, Highway 74, and Highway 110 pass through the county for a few miles on their way to other destinations.

The county also contains the Sylamore Scenic Byway, an Arkansas Scenic Byway and National Forest Scenic Byway.

Utilities

Entergy Arkansas is the sole provider of electricity in almost all of Stone County, with exceptions in the northern tip (served by North Arkansas Electric Cooperative), south of Mountain View (First Electric Cooperative) and the southwest corner (Petit Jean Electric Cooperative).

The Arkansas Department of Health (ADH) is responsible for the regulation and oversight of public water systems throughout the state. Stone County contains six community water systems: the City of Fifty-Six Water Department, the City of Mountain View Water Department, Pleasant Grove Water Association, Richwoods Water Association, Sylamore Valley Water Association, and the West Stone County Water Association. Mountain View has the largest direct retail population served (7,295, all in Stone County), followed by West Stone County (4,634, including customers served in adjacent counties), Pleasant Grove Water Association (2,315), and Richwoods Water Association (1,436), with the remaining systems under 600 retail population served. Of the water systems serving Stone County, only Fifty-Six uses groundwater, the Gunter Sandstone Aquifer, though also purchasing water from Big Flat, which pumps from the same aquifer. The City of Mountain View uses the White River, and the remaining systems purchasing treated water from Mountain View.

See also
 List of lakes in Stone County, Arkansas
 National Register of Historic Places listings in Stone County, Arkansas

Notes

References

External links
 Stone County official website 
 Stone County, Arkansas entry on the Encyclopedia of Arkansas History & Culture
Stone County Sheriff's Office

 
1873 establishments in Arkansas
Populated places established in 1873